The 1995/96 FIS Snowboard World Cup was 2nd multi race tournament over a season for snowboarding organised by International Ski Federation. The season started on 21 November 1995 and ended on 17 March 1996. This season included four disciplines: parallel slalom, giant slalom, slalom and halfpipe.

Men

Giant slalom

Parallel

Halfpipe

Slalom

Ladies

Giant slalom

Parallel

Halfpipe

Slalom

Standings: Men

References

FIS Snowboard World Cup
1995 in snowboarding
1996 in snowboarding